Route 133 is a historic and heritage road of the Estrie and Montérégie regions in the province of Quebec, with north/south orientation and located on the eastern shore of the Richelieu River. Its northern terminus is in Sorel-Tracy, on the south shore of the Saint Lawrence River. The southern terminus is in Saint-Armand at the United States border with Vermont, close to Highgate Springs, where it continues southward past the Highgate Springs–St. Armand/Philipsburg Border Crossing as Interstate 89. Prior to the 1970s, the portion between the international border and Saint-Jean-sur-Richelieu was known as Route 7, which served as a continuation of US 7.

Route 133 is designated as historic and called Chemin des Patriotes in honour of the Patriot Rebellion of 1837–1838.

The stretch between the US border and Saint-Jean-sur-Richelieu, where Autoroute 35 begins, is relatively busy, as it provides the main link between Boston and Montreal. Construction to extend Autoroute 35 south of Saint-Jean-sur-Richelieu to the US border by-passing Route 133 started in 2009. Construction was slated to be finished in 2017 but will continue until 2023.

Trucks are prohibited on this road between Saint-Jean-sur-Richelieu and Autoroute 10 (section of 10 km) and between the junction of road 116 in Mont-Saint-Hilaire and Autoroute 20 (section of 3.5 km). Controversy persists and has gained momentum in 2005 between the Ministry of Transports of Quebec and nearly 3000 residents along the road at Saint-Denis-sur-Richelieu, Saint-Charles-sur-Richelieu, and Mont Saint-Hilaire, north of Autoroute 20. The controversy follows the ministry's decision in 1995 to transfer north-south truck traffic from the roads parallel to the 133 and force it to converge, without an impact study, on chemin des Patriotes, a historical and heritage path that is on a fragile and weak soil and is in the most populated area. The resulting intense heavy traffic generates noise, vibrations, and pollution day and night, which cause health, insomnia, and safety problems in the local population.

Municipalities along Route 133

 Saint-Armand
 Pike River
 Saint-Sébastien
 Henryville
 Sainte-Anne-de-Sabrevois
 Saint-Athanase
 Saint-Jean-sur-Richelieu
 Richelieu
 Saint-Mathias-sur-Richelieu
 Otterburn Park
 Mont-Saint-Hilaire
 Saint-Charles-sur-Richelieu
 Saint-Denis-sur-Richelieu
 Saint-Ours
 Sainte-Victoire-de-Sorel
 Sorel-Tracy

See also
 List of Quebec provincial highways

References

External links 
 Provincial Route Map (Courtesy of the Quebec Ministry of Transportation) 
 Route 133 on Google Maps

133
Transport in Saint-Jean-sur-Richelieu
Transport in Sorel-Tracy